Brachynotus is a genus of crabs, comprising the following species:
Brachynotus atlanticus Forest, 1957
Brachynotus foresti Zariquiey Alvarez, 1968
Brachynotus gemmellari (Rizza, 1839)
Brachynotus gemmellaroi (Rizza, 1839)
Brachynotus sexdentatus (Risso, 1827)
Brachynotus spinosus (H. Milne-Edwards, 1853)

References

Grapsoidea